Craigowl Hill is a summit towards the eastern end of the Sidlaw Hills in Angus, Scotland. Northeast of Kirkton of Auchterhouse and approximately eight kilometres north of Dundee, Craigowl Hill represents the highest point in the range. It also known for being one of the hardest cycling climbs in Scotland, as a 3.36 km (2 mile) climb at 9.4%.

Geodesy
Craigowl Hill was the origin (meridian) of the 6 inch and 1:2500 Ordnance Survey maps of Angus (Forfarshire).

See also
Wester Denoon
List of places in Angus

References

External links

 Computer-generated virtual panoramas Craigowl Hill Index
 Strava segment 

Hills of the Scottish Midland Valley
Mountains and hills of Angus, Scotland
Marilyns of Scotland